Quechumaran or Kechumaran is a language-family proposal that unites Quechua and Aymara. Quechuan languages, especially those of the south, share a large amount of vocabulary with Aymara. Terrence Kaufman finds the proposal reasonably convincing, but Willem Adelaar, a Quechua specialist, believes the similarities to be caused by borrowing during long-term contact. Lyle Campbell suspects that the proposal is valid but does not consider it to have been conclusively proved.

Moulian et al. (2015) posits the Puquina language of the Tiwanaku Empire as a possible source for some of the shared vocabulary between Quechua, Aymara and Mapuche.

An automated computational analysis (ASJP 4) by Müller et al. (2013) also groups Quechuan and Aymaran together. However, since the analysis was automatically generated, the grouping could be either due to mutual lexical borrowing or genetic inheritance.

Swadesh lists
100-word Swadesh lists of Proto-Aymaran and Proto-Quechuan from Cerrón (2000):

{| class="wikitable sortable"
! no. !! gloss !! Proto-Quechuan !! Proto-Aymaran
|-
| 1. || I || *ya-qa || *na-ya
|-
| 2. || you || *qam || *huma
|-
| 3. || we || *ya-qa-nčik || *hiwa-sa
|-
| 4. || this || *kay || *aka
|-
| 5. || that || *čay || *uka
|-
| 6. || who? || *pi || *qači
|-
| 7. || what? || *ima || *qu
|-
| 8. || not || *mana || *hani
|-
| 9. || all || *λapa || *taqi
|-
| 10. || many || *ačka || *aλuqa
|-
| 11. || one || *ŝuk || *maya
|-
| 12. || two || *iŝkay || *paya
|-
| 13. || big || *hatu(n) || *haĉ’a
|-
| 14. || long || *suni || *suni
|-
| 15. || small || *učuk || *hisk’a
|-
| 16. || woman || *warmi || *marmi
|-
| 17. || man || *qari || *čača
|-
| 18. || person || *runa || *haqi
|-
| 19. || fish || *čaλwa || *čǎλwa
|-
| 20. || bird || *pisqu || *amač’i
|-
| 21. || dog || *aλqu || *anu(qa)
|-
| 22. || louse || *usa || *lap’a
|-
| 23. || tree || *maλki || *quqa
|-
| 24. || seed || *muhu || *atʰa
|-
| 25. || leaf || *rapra || *lapʰi
|-
| 26. || root || *sapʰi || *asu
|-
| 27. || bark || *qara || *siλp’i
|-
| 28. || skin || *qara || *lip’iči
|-
| 29. || flesh || *ayča || *hanči
|-
| 30. || blood || *yawar || *wila
|-
| 31. || bone || *tuλu || *ĉ’aka
|-
| 32. || grease || *wira || *lik’i
|-
| 33. || egg || *runtu / *ruru || *k’awna
|-
| 34. || horn || *waqra || *waqra
|-
| 35. || tail || *ĉupa || *wič’inkʰa
|-
| 36. || feather || *pʰuru || *pʰuyu
|-
| 37. || hair || *aqča / *čukča || *nik’uĉa
|-
| 38. || head || *uma || *p’iqi
|-
| 39. || ear || *rinri || *hinču
|-
| 40. || eye || *ñawi || *nawra
|-
| 41. || nose || *sinqa || *nasa
|-
| 42. || mouth || *simi || *laka
|-
| 43. || tooth || *kiru || *laka ĉ’akʰa
|-
| 44. || tongue || *qaλu || *laqra
|-
| 45. || claw || *ŝiλu || *šiλu
|-
| 46. || foot || *ĉaki || *kayu
|-
| 47. || knee || *qunqur || *qhunquru
|-
| 48. || hand || *maki || *ampara
|-
| 49. || belly || *paĉa / *wiksa || *puĉa(ka)
|-
| 50. || neck || *kunka || *kunka
|-
| 51. || breasts || *ñuñu || *ñuñu
|-
| 52. || heart || *ŝunqu || *čuyma
|-
| 53. || liver || *k’ipĉa(n) || *k’ipĉa
|-
| 54. || drink || *upya- || *uma-
|-
| 55. || eat || *mikʰu- || *manq’a- / *palu-
|-
| 56. || bite || *kani- || *aĉu-
|-
| 57. || see || *rikʰu- || *uλa-
|-
| 58. || hear || *uya- || *iša-
|-
| 59. || know || *yaĉa- || *yaĉi-
|-
| 60. || sleep || *puñu- || *iki-
|-
| 61. || die || *wañu- || *hiwa-
|-
| 62. || kill || *wañu-či- || *hiwa-ya-
|-
| 63. || swim || *wayt’a- || *tuyu-
|-
| 64. || fly || *pʰaya-ri- || *hala-
|-
| 65. || walk || *puri- || *sara- / *wasa-
|-
| 66. || come || *ŝa-mu- || *huta-
|-
| 67. || lie || *anĉ’a-ra- || *haqu-ši-
|-
| 68. || sit || *taya-ku- || *uta-ĉ’a-
|-
| 69. || stand || *ŝaya-ri- || *saya-
|-
| 70. || give || *qu- || *čura-
|-
| 71. || say || *ñi- || *saya-
|-
| 72. || sun || *rupay || *lupi
|-
| 73. || moon || *kiλa || *paqši
|-
| 74. || star || *quyλur || *wara(wara)
|-
| 75. || water || *yaku || *uma
|-
| 76. || rain || *tamya / *para || *haλu
|-
| 77. || stone || *rumi || *qala
|-
| 78. || sand || *aqu || *č’aλa
|-
| 79. || earth || *paĉa || *uraqi
|-
| 80. || cloud || *pʰuyu / *pukutay || *qhinaya / *urpi
|-
| 81. || smoke || *q’usñi / *quntay || *iwq’i
|-
| 82. || fire || *nina || *nina
|-
| 83. || ashes || *uĉpa || *qhiλa
|-
| 84. || burn || *k’añay || *nak’a-
|-
| 85. || path || *ñayani || *tʰaki
|-
| 86. || mountain || *urqu || *quλu
|-
| 87. || red || *puka || *čupika
|-
| 88. || green || *q’umir / *ĉiqya(q) || *č’uqña
|-
| 89. || yellow || *q’iλu / *qarwa || *tuyu
|-
| 90. || white || *yuraq || *anq’u
|-
| 91. || black || *yana || *ĉ’iyara
|-
| 92. || night || *tuta || *aruma
|-
| 93. || hot || *q’unu || *hunĉ’u
|-
| 94. || cold || *čiri || *tʰaya
|-
| 95. || full || *hunta || *pʰuqa
|-
| 96. || new || *muŝuq || *mačaqa
|-
| 97. || good || *aλi || *aski
|-
| 98. || round || *muyu || *muruqu
|-
| 99. || dry || *čaki || *waña
|-
| 100. || name || *suti || *suti
|}

Further reading
Orr, C. J.; Longacre, R. E. (1968). Proto Quechumaran. Language, 44:528-55.

References

Proposed language families